The second season of the Canadian reality competition show Top Chef Canada was broadcast on Food Network in Canada. It is a Canadian spin-off of Bravo's hit show Top Chef. In the first season, 16 chefs competed against each other in weekly challenges. The program took place in Toronto.

Contestants
16 chefs competed in season two. Names, ages, hometowns, and cities of residence (at time of filming) are from the Food Network Canada website.  In the order eliminated:

 William Thompson, 30, Caledonia, ON (Hometown: Caledonia, ON)
 Kunal Ghose, 39, Victoria, BC (Hometown: Victoria, BC)
 Sarah Tsai, 30, Toronto, ON (Hometown: Taipei, Taiwan)
 Sergio Mattoscio, 30, Montreal, QC (Hometown: Montreal, QC)
 Joel Aubie, 27, Tofino, BC (Hometown: Bathurst, NB)
 Gabriell Cruz, 25, Dundas, ON (Hometown: Hamilton, ON)
 Elizabeth Rivasplata, 31, Toronto, ON (Hometown: Lima, Peru)
 Curtis Luk, 28, Ottawa, ON (Hometown: Markham, ON)
 Jimmy Stewart, 23, Whistler, British Columbia (Hometown: North Vancouver, BC)
 Ryan Gallagher, 33, Toronto, ON (Hometown: Toronto, ON)
 Trista Sheen, 29, Toronto, ON (Hometown: Toronto, ON)
 Xavier Lacaze, 30, Calgary, AB (Hometown: Auch, France)
 David Crystian, 37, Toronto, ON (Hometown: Toronto, ON)
 Jonathan Korecki, 27, Ottawa, ON (Hometown: Caledon, ON)
 Trevor Bird, 28, Vancouver, BC (Hometown: Montreal, QC)
 Carl Heinrich, 26, Toronto, ON (Hometown: Sooke, BC)

Contestant progress

: Although she was in the bottom, Sarah was spared from elimination as she had immunity.
: Did not gain immunity.
: Eliminated by placing last in the quickfire challenge.
: Won comeback challenge and was allowed back into the final challenge.
 (WINNER) The chef won the season and was crowned Top Chef.
 (RUNNER-UP) The chef was a runner-up for the season.
 (THIRD-PLACE) The chef placed third in the competition.
 (FOURTH-PLACE) The chef placed fourth in the competition.
 (WIN) The chef won that episode's Elimination Challenge.
 (HIGH) The chef was selected as one of the top entries in the Elimination Challenge, but did not win.
 (LOW) The chef was selected as one of the bottom entries in the Elimination Challenge, but was not eliminated.
 (OUT) The chef lost that week's Elimination Challenge and was out of the competition.
 (IN) The chef neither won nor lost that week's Elimination Challenge. They also were not up to be eliminated.

Episodes
The format of season two followed that of the first season and of the original American Top Chef. As before, each week features a guest judge or special guest, including Top Chef: Masters season two winner Chef Marcus Samuelsson, television handy-man Mike Holmes, Toronto Maple Leafs forward Colby Armstrong, actor Alan Thicke, Spencer "Spenny" Rice, and country musician Johnny Reid.

References

Canada, Season 2
2012 Canadian television seasons